Ismaning station is a tunnel station on the Munich S-Bahn in the town of Ismaning in the northeast area of Munich, Germany. It is served by line S 8.

History
Until 1992 the former above-ground station was the terminus of the old S 3 line from Nannhofen via Munich-Pasing – Munich Hauptbahnhof – Munich Ostbahnhof to Ismaning. Originally it was intended to extend the line to the Franz Josef Strauss Airport by running the present-day S 8 above ground through the district. After local protests it was decided to lay the S-Bahn route from the southern edge of the district to Osterfeldstrasse in a tunnel. The tunnel station was built at the same spot as the old station and was opened on 17 May 1992. The delay in constructing the S-Bahn link had no negative impact on the airport, because its construction was postponed by legal disputes.

Until 20 November 2005 Ismaning station was, apart from the tunnel station at the airport, the only underground S-Bahn station outside the main S-Bahn line in Munich. Since 21 November 2005 Unterföhring station has also been underground.

Gallery

References

Munich S-Bahn stations
Railway stations in Bavaria
Railway stations in Germany opened in 1909
Railway stations in Germany opened in 1992
Railway stations located underground in Germany